The Union for Peace and Development Party (UPD or XMNH), is a socially conservative political party in Somalia. The ideology is a composition of nationalism and moderate Islamism. The UPD party is one of the largest Somali political parties and some leading members of the party were former members of the government of former Somali president Sharif Sheikh Ahmed, and incumbent Somali president Hassan Sheikh Mohamud. UPD is also a member of the Forum for National Parties which is led by Sharif Sheikh Ahmed.

As of October 2018, Mohamud was the leader of the UPD.

In 2018, while the UPD was being formed, it was awarded a registration certificate, and the party was officially unveiled on 4 October 2018. The first official gathering took place in mid April 2019 where it elected a new leader of the party, executive members and central body of the party.

References

Political parties in Somalia
Political parties established in 2018
Islamic political parties in Somalia
Islamic democratic political parties